Reginald Francis Carson (January 12, 1902 – April 21, 1957) was a National Hockey League forward from 1926 to 1934. He was born in Bracebridge, Ontario. Frank was one of three Carson brothers to play in the NHL, along with younger brother Gerry and older brother Bill. He won a Stanley Cup championship in 1926 with the Montreal Maroons. After the 1929-30 season he was sold to the New York Americans, along with Mike Neville, Red Dutton, and Hap Emms for $35,000. With the latter he was traded to the Detroit Falcons during the 1931-32 season. He retired after 246 games, recording 42 goals and 48 assists for a total of 90 points.

Career statistics

Regular season and playoffs

References

External links

Obituary at LostHockey.com

1902 births
1957 deaths
Canadian ice hockey right wingers
Detroit Falcons players
Detroit Red Wings players
Ice hockey people from Ontario
Montreal Maroons players
New Haven Eagles players
New York Americans players
People from Bracebridge, Ontario
Stanley Cup champions
Windsor Bulldogs (1929–1936) players